Solera Inc is an American company based in Texas which provides risk management and asset protection software and services to the automotive industry and property insurance marketplace. Solera also provides digital identity management services, as well as re-underwriting and data analytics for the automotive, property and casualty insurance industries. Solera is active in 88 countries across six continents.

Solera became part of the S&P 400 after an Initial public offering in May 2007. In March 2016, however, Solera was bought out by private equity firm Vista Equity Partners, once more becoming a private entity.

Companies owned by Solera include, HPI, Autodata, and Sidexa amongst others.

Company history
Solera was founded in January 2005 by American businessman Tony Aquila.

In February 2006, private equity firm GTCR announced a partnership with Aquila involving investments of up to $100 million of equity capital.

In April 2006, Solera and private equity firm GTCR announced the completion of their acquisition of the Claims Services Group of Automatic Data Processing (NYSE: ADP) for $975 million in cash. Solera acquired operating companies that employ over 2,000 associates in 31 countries in the deal and generated over $410 million in annual revenue from more than 50,000 global customers.

In May 2007, Solera completed an IPO, trading on the New York Stock Exchange under the symbol "SLH".

In September 2015, Solera announced an agreement to be acquired by Vista Equity Partners, Goldman Sachs, Koch Industries, and other affiliated investors for approximately $6.5 billion. The transaction was completed in March 2016.

In July 2016, Solera announced it had entered into a definitive agreement to acquire Enservio, Inc, a Massachusetts-based company that provides software and services to the property contents insurance marketplace.

In 2021, Vista was reportedly planning to have Solera go public again via a special-purpose acquisition company (SPAC).

Timeline of Acquisitions
 2006: Acquisition of ADP including Audatex, Informex, Sidexa, ABZ, and Hollander
 2008: Acquisition of Inpart, UCS, and HPI
 2009: Acquisition of AUTOonline
 2010: Acquisitions of Digidentity and Market Scan
 2011: Acquisitions of Explore Information Services, Sinexia, See Progress, Commerce Delta, and New Era
 2012: Acquisitions of CarweB, Actual Systems, APU and LMI
 2013: Acquisition of DST and formation of a joint venture with SRS
 2014: Acquisitions of I&S, CAP and Sherwood
 2015: Acquisitions of Service Dynamics, IBS Automotive and DMEautomotive
 2016: Acquisition of Enservio, and Autodata
 2017: Acquisition of Digidentity, and Colimbra
 2021: Acquisition of Omnitracs and DealerSocket,
 2022: Acquisition of Spireon,

References

Privately held companies based in Texas
Companies formerly listed on the New York Stock Exchange
2007 initial public offerings
2016 mergers and acquisitions
Private equity portfolio companies